In the history of the National Football League (NFL), 21 different quarterbacks have passed for at least 500 yards in a single game 26 times, a feat also referred to as the "500 Club". Norm Van Brocklin was the first to do so, whose 554-yard performance in a 1951 game remains the league record for most passing yards in a game. Only three quarterbacks have thrown for over 500 yards more than once in their career; Drew Brees and Tom Brady did so twice (both of Brees' 500-yard games occurred in regular season games, while Brady had one 500-yard game each in both a regular season game and a postseason game), and Ben Roethlisberger did so four times (three times in the regular season and once in the postseason). No quarterback has thrown for 600 yards in a league game during regulation, but Tom Brady was the first player to total 600 or more yards passing over four consecutive quarters. 

Brady and Roethlisberger are the only quarterbacks to have thrown for over 500 yards in a postseason game; Brady did so in a Super Bowl LII loss to the Philadelphia Eagles during the 2017–18 playoffs while Roethlisberger did so in a Wild Card round loss to the Cleveland Browns during the 2020–21 NFL playoffs. Ben Roethlisberger holds the record for most 500 yard performances in the regular season with three and most overall  with four when including the postseason. Quarterbacks throwing for 500 yards have amassed 14 wins and 12 losses while doing so. Over time, the frequency of quarterbacks throwing for 500 or more yards in a game has increased, with 16 of 26 such performances occurring since 2010.

List

See also
 List of NFL quarterbacks with seven touchdown passes in a game
 List of NFL quarterbacks who have posted a perfect passer rating
 List of NFL quarterbacks who have posted a passer rating of zero

References

Passing games, 500-yard
National Football League lists